The 708th Infantry Division (German: 708. Infanteriedivision) was a German Army infantry division in World War II.

History 
The 708th Infantry Division was formed in May 1941 and transferred to France in June to serve as an occupational force in the area around  Bordeaux and Royan.

A month after the D-day landings in July 1944, the 708th were moved north-west to Normandy to cut off the Allies' supply lines. Failing to halt the allied advance, the Wehrmacht quickly moved out of France in August. The division's commander, Generalmajor Arndt was killed in Troyes on 24 August during the evacuation. The 708th was destroyed near Le Mans in the evacuation. Survivors were moved into the newly formed 708th People's Grenadier Division (708. Volks grenadierdivision).

Order of battle
1941
728. Infanterie-Regiment
748. Infanterie-Regiment
658. Artillerie-Abteilung
708. Pionier-Kompanie
708. Nachrichten-Kompanie
708. Versorgungstruppen

1944
728. Grenadier-Regiment
748. Grenadier-Regiment
360. Festungs-Grenadier-Regiment
708. Divisions-Füsilier-Bataillon
658. Artillerie-Regiment
708. FlaK-Kompanie
708. Feldersatz-Bataillon
708. Panzerjäger-Kompanie
708. Pionier-Bataillon
708. Nachrichten-Abteilung
708. Versorgungstruppen

Commanders 
Generalmajor Walter Drobnig (3 May 1941 - 1 Mar 1942)
Generalleutnant z.V. Hermann Wilck (1 Mar 1942 - 30 July 1943)
Generalmajor Edgar Arndt (30 July 1943 - 24 Aug 1944) (KIA) (1)

Operations Officers
Major Wilhelm Breidenstein (Sep 1943 - Feb 1944)
Oberstleutnant Heinz-Joachim Mueller-Lamkow (Feb 1944 - Aug 1944)

Sources

Military units and formations established in 1941
Military units and formations disestablished in 1944
Infantry divisions of Germany during World War II